Durham County Cricket Club was officially founded on 23 May 1882. Durham's team was elevated to first-class status in 1992 when the club joined the County Championship. It is one of eighteen county teams in England and Wales that play first-class cricket. The player appointed club captain leads the team in all fixtures except if unavailable.

 A. A. W. Mewburn (1882–1885)
 J. A. Pease (1886–1891)
 A. B. Crosby (1892)
 W. F. Whitwell (1893–1896)
 R. H. Mallett (1897)
 R. Bousfield (1898)
 J. F. Whitwell (1899–1902)
 E. W. Elliot (1903–1906)
 T. Coulson (1907–1911)
 C. Y. Adamson (1912)
 E. B. Proud (1913–1919)
 T. Kinch (1920–1923)
 H. Brooks (1924–1928)
 H. C. Ferens (1929–1931)
 T. K. Dobson (1932–1936)
 D. C. H. Townsend (1937–1947)
 R. B. Proud (1947–1955)
 D. W. Hardy (1955–1967)
 H. J. Bailey (1968–1971)
 R. Inglis (1972)
 B. R. Lander (1973–1979)
 N. A. Riddell (1980–1991)
 D. A. Graveney (1992–1993)
 P. Bainbridge (1994)
 M. A. Roseberry (1995–1996)
 D. C. Boon (1997–1999)
 N. J. Speak (2000)
 J. J. B. Lewis (2001–2004)
 M. E. K. Hussey (2005)
 D. M. Benkenstein (2006–2008)
 W. R. Smith (2009–2010)
 P. Mustard (2011–2012)
 P. D. Collingwood (2013–2018)
 C. T. Bancroft (2019)
 E. J. H. Eckersley (2020)
 S. G. Borthwick (2021 to date)

See also
 List of Durham CCC players

Notes

cricket
Durham
Durham County Cricket Club
Durham